Kaynaşlı is a town in Düzce Province in the Black Sea region of Turkey. It is the seat of Kaynaşlı District. Its population is 10,176 (2022). The mayor is Birol Şahin.

References

Populated places in Düzce Province
Kaynaşlı District
Towns in Turkey